Welcome is a series of Indian comedy films, produced by Firoz Nadiadwala and directed by Anees Bazmee. The first part Welcome released in 2007 and the second part Welcome Back released in 2015. A third part named Welcome to the Jungle is currently in production.

Overview

Welcome (2007)

Uday (Nana Patekar), a criminal don, decides to find a husband for his kindhearted sister Sanjana (Katrina Kaif), but he is unsuccessful since no one wants to be associated with a crime family. Dr. Ghunghroo (Paresh Rawal) has also been trying to get his nephew, Rajiv (Akshay Kumar), married but due to his condition—the alliance must be with a purely decent family—he is also unsuccessful.

When Rajiv jumps into a burning building to save Sanjana, he is smitten by her. Uday and Majnu (Anil Kapoor), Uday's brother gangster hatch a plan for an alliance with Dr. Ghunghroo. The plan works and Dr. Ghunghroo confirms the alliance, thinking that Uday is a very decent man. But when he is later told that Uday and Majnu are mobsters, he quickly takes his family and flees to Sun City, South Africa to escape. However, Majnu and Sanjana have come to Sun City as well. Rajiv meets Sanjana again and the two fall in love.

Dr. Ghunghroo reconciles with Uday and Majnu and finally agrees to the alliance. Uday and Majnu invite a powerful don of the underworld, RDX (Feroz Khan) to the engagement. At the party, a girl named Ishika (Malika Sherawat) arrives, claiming to be Rajiv's childhood betrothed. Ishika is actually the sister-in-law of Dr.Ghunghroo whom Dr. Ghunghroo asked to come and try to break off the engagement. Ishika manages to do so, leaving Rajiv and Sanjana heartbroken. Dr. Ghunghroo reveals that he did this for Rajiv's mother, who had married into a crime family and was harassed and tortured, thus telling Dr. Ghunghroo to raise Rajiv away from crime when he was born. Dr. Ghunghroo decides he will agree to the marriage only if Uday and Majnu give up their life of crime. Rajiv and Sanjana do this by reawakening Uday's love for acting and encouraging Majnu to pursue his love for painting. With these things keeping them busy, Uday and Majnu have no time for crime any more.

Rajiv's actions anger RDX's son, Lucky, who attempts to shoot Rajiv. Sanjana gets hold of the gun and fires a shot that hits Lucky, causing him to go unconscious. RDX is informed of his son's death and comes to attend the cremation. However Lucky, who is still alive, escapes, trying to show his father that he's actually alive. RDX sets the pile of wood on fire, believing he is cremating his son's body. However Lucky, who had been hiding under the wood, jumps out upon realising the wood is on fire, and the truth is revealed to RDX. Rajiv, Ghunghroo, his wife, Ishika, Uday, Majnu and Sanjana are captured by RDX and brought to a cabin set next to a cliff. The frightened group is forced to play Passing the Parcel (Hot Potato) with a globe—but the one who ends up with the globe must jump off the cliff. When Rajiv refuses to pass the globe to Sanjana, Lucky angrily yanks it out of his hands, just as the music stops. Now that his son has the globe, RDX figures the only way he can maintain his image is by killing everyone. Before he can, several government brokers sneak up and cut the footings of the cabin, causing the house to start falling over the cliff, with everyone trapped inside. However, the cabin is suspended by only one column. Hilarious chaos ensues as the group tries to balance the cabin together and keep it from falling off the cliff. Rajiv finds a rope and the group uses it to get back onto stable ground. But to everyone's shock, the floor breaks and Lucky is found hanging on the edge of the cabin. While Rajiv is trying to rescue him, Sanjana reveals the truth to everyone that she was the one who shot Lucky, but Rajiv blamed himself so that Sanjana wouldn't get in trouble. After Rajiv rescues Lucky, the cabin he is standing on falls off into the cliff. Sanjana keeps crying for him thinking he is dead. However, Rajiv survives the event and is reunited with Sanjana and his family. Lucky and RDX are grateful to Rajiv for saving their lives and RDX gives up his life of crime, allowing Rajiv and Sanjana to finally get married.

Welcome Back (2015)

Uday Shetty (Nana Patekar) and Majnu Bhai (Anil Kapoor) end a life of crime and become honest businessmen, settling in Dubai. Two conwomen from India, Poonam (Dimple Kapadia) and Babita (Ankita Shrivastava), present themselves as Maharani Padmavati and Rajkumari Chandini of Najafgarh to con Uday and Majnu of their money. Babita causes the two men to fall in love with her, thus getting them to finance herself and Poonam's luxurious lifestyle. Later, it is revealed that Uday has another sister Ranjana (Shruti Haasan) from his father's third  marriage and Majnu and Uday are emotionally blackmailed by Uday's father into arranging the marriage of Ranjana and are also forced to do so as Poonam makes that one of her conditions for getting Babita married to either one of them.

The movie then shifts to Dr. Ghunguroo (Paresh Rawal), who has found out that he has a step son from his wife's previous marriage, Ajju a.k.a. Ajay (John Abraham). Ajju is a local goon of Mumbai, where Ranjana studies. Through a chain of hilarious events, they both fall in love with each other. Meanwhile, Majnu and Uday arrange the marriage of Ranjana with the step-son of Doctor Ghunguroo, not knowing that he is a goon. However, at the engagement ceremony, Majnu reveals the truth of Ajju, to which Ajju resists with a fight, threatening to marry Ranjana without any of the brothers' consent.

In order to keep Ajju at bay, Uday and Majnu visit Wanted Bhai, (Naseeruddin Shah), who is an infamous blind don. The brothers are shocked to find that Wanted's son Honey (Shiney Ahuja) likes Ranjana and would like to marry her. They decide to arrange the marriage of Ranjana to some other decent man, in order to sidestep Ajju as well as Wanted's son. However, due to Ajju and Dr. Ghunguroo, who are in league with Babita and Poonam, they are caught by Wanted Bhai, who summons them to his island.

There, Ajju and Dr. Ghunguroo try to convince Honey that he no longer loves Ranjana and that Babita is his true love. Meanwhile, Uday and Majnu try to kill Ajju, but are frightened at the graveyard in a ghost act planned by Dr. Ghunguroo, Ajju and Ranjana. Unbeknownst to all of them, their activities have been recorded by closed-circuit television, causing Wanted Bhai and Honey to plan to finish them off. However, in a hilarious climax scene, Honey is kidnapped by all of them and they escape towards the desert where they are chased by Wanted Bhai. In the midst of saving himself, Dr. Ghunguroo pushes Wanted Bhai, causing him to faint. Meanwhile, a group of camels heavily march there. Ajju is successful in saving Wanted Bhai from the stampede of camels, and restoring his sight. Wanted Bhai himself, as a form of gratitude, arranges the marriage of Ajju with Ranjana, calling Ajju his 'second son'.

Welcome to the Jungle (TBA)

After the success of two films, makers are planning a third part of this franchise. Reportedly it has been titled Welcome to the Jungle. Producer Firoz Nadiadwala said it won't take that much time to made the second film after first. It will be on floor less than a year. 
In 2018, it was reported that the third film will go on floors soon with a new director helming the film.

Cast and characters

Crew

Release and revenue

References

External links
 
 

Indian film series
Action film series
Comedy film series